Paul is the sixth and third self-released studio album by American singer-songwriter PJ Morton. It was released on August 9, 2019, by Morton Records and Empire Records. Paul incorporates R&B styles with elements of soul music. The album is entirely produced by Morton himself and features guest appearances by Tobe Nwigwe, Jazmine Sullivan, Rapsody, JoJo and Angela Rye.

Paul received positive reviews from most music critics and peaked at #4 on the R&B/Hip-Hop Billboard charts. "Say So" scored Morton's first top-10 single on 'Billboards Adult R&B Songs chart.<ref>{{Cite web|url=http://abcnewsradioonline.com/music-news/2019/9/10/pj-morton-scores-first-top-10-single-on-billboards-adult-rb.html|title=PJ Morton scores first top-10 single on 'Billboards Adult R&B Songs chart with "Say So" - Music News - ABC News Radio|website=abcnewsradioonline.com}}</ref>

Paul earned Morton three Grammy nominations for Best R&B Album, Best R&B Song and Best Traditional R&B Performance at the 62nd Annual Grammy Awards.

Background

The album was first announced on July 23, 2019. Paul, which follows 2017's Gumbo Unplugged, was described by Morton to be "the most honest expression of myself and my art that I've ever made". "Everybody calls me PJ, but I came into this world as Paul. That struck me as the perfect title for this album because Paul is the purest form of who I am." According to Morton, Gumbo was originally set to be his last album, but his move back to his hometown re-inspired him. "I was struggling to figure out who I wanted to be and where I could fit in as a solo artist, and it honestly left me feeling pretty defeated" he said. "Coming back to New Orleans inspired a lot of new growth and perspective, though, and it helped me realize that the best thing I could be was myself."

Track listing

Charts

References

2019 albums
PJ Morton albums